Gauss map may refer to:
 The Gauss map, a mapping of the Euclidean space onto a sphere
 The Gauss iterated map, an iterated nonlinear map
 The function  see Gauss–Kuzmin–Wirsing operator

See also List of topics named after Carl Friedrich Gauss.